SDY may refer to:
Sandy railway station, Bedfordshire, England (Station code)
Sidney-Richland Municipal Airport, Montana, United States (IATA Airport Code)
SDY, the ticker symbol for SPDR S&P Dividend exchange-traded fund
the Amtrak station code for Schenectady, NY